is a Japanese alpine skier. She competed in the women's giant slalom at the 2018 Winter Olympics.

References

1994 births
Living people
Japanese female alpine skiers
Olympic alpine skiers of Japan
Alpine skiers at the 2018 Winter Olympics
Place of birth missing (living people)